Heal the Living is a 2016 drama film directed by Katell Quillévéré from a screenplay she co-wrote with Gilles Taurand, based on the 2013 novel Réparer les vivants (Mend the Living) by Maylis de Kerangal. It stars Tahar Rahim, Emmanuelle Seigner, Anne Dorval, Bouli Lanners and Kool Shen. Heal the Living interweaves three stories connected to each other via an organ transplant. The film was presented in the Horizons section at the 73rd Venice International Film Festival.

Cast

Critical response
Heal the Living has a 92% approval rating on Rotten Tomatoes based on 59 reviews, with an average rating of 7.6/10, and an 82/100 on Metacritic based on 12 critics, indicating "universal acclaim".

Variety described the film as "sublimely compassionate, heart-crushing". Screendaily said the film is "an emotionally satisfying, cinematically deft look at interwoven fates...which knits together quietly luminous performances".

Accolades

References

External links
 
 

2016 films
2016 drama films
2010s French-language films
Belgian drama films
Films based on French novels
Films directed by Katell Quillévéré
Films scored by Alexandre Desplat
French drama films
Medical-themed films
French-language Belgian films
2010s French films